Rudolf "Rudi" Thanner (20 August 1944 – 9 August 2007) was an ice hockey player who played for the West German national team. He won a bronze medal at the 1976 Winter Olympics.

References

External links

1944 births
2007 deaths
EV Füssen players
Ice hockey players at the 1968 Winter Olympics
Ice hockey players at the 1972 Winter Olympics
Ice hockey players at the 1976 Winter Olympics
Medalists at the 1976 Winter Olympics
Olympic bronze medalists for West Germany
Olympic ice hockey players of West Germany
Olympic medalists in ice hockey
Sportspeople from Füssen
Recipients of the Silver Laurel Leaf
West German ice hockey defencemen
German ice hockey defencemen
German sportsperson-politicians
20th-century German politicians